Garcinia monantha is a species of flowering plant in the family Clusiaceae. It is a tree endemic to Peninsular Malaysia.

References

monantha
Endemic flora of Peninsular Malaysia
Trees of Peninsular Malaysia
Least concern plants
Taxonomy articles created by Polbot